Commuter Express is a Commuter service of the Philippine National Railways, it was previously operated by ex Japanese coaches, now operated by DMUs, manufactured by Hyundai Rotem.

References

Hyundai Rotem multiple units